The Other Side of Deception is a follow-up to the best-selling  nonfiction book By Way of Deception by Victor Ostrovsky, a former Mossad agent with operational knowledge. It contains a bibliography of newspaper articles in support of original book.

Summary

The book concerns the concept of a Mossad divide and conquer strategy, pitting secular Arabs against Islamist Arabs and between Arab Muslims and Non-Arab Muslims such as between Iran and Iraq. The Mossad assists Hamas in destroying the PLO and creates a civil war between the secular and Islamist factions of the Palestinians. The book was written in 1994, but his predictions came true with the election of Hamas in the Gaza strip and the civil war that broke through between Hamas and the PLO. The relations between Hamas and the Mossad soured after the Second Intifada, which occurred after the writing of this book.

In the Iran–Contra affair, Israel helps arm the Iranians during the Iran-Iraq war with the ultimate goal of using Iran to create major damage to Iraq, which would be too busy to retaliate.

Mossad poisoned German politician Uwe Barschel, who had helped Mossad in their dealings with the Iranians but was going to reveal the secrets of his dealings. The murder was very unusual because his corpse was found fully clothed in a bathtub full of water, in an attempt to make it look like a suicide. In July 2011, German authorities in Lübeck announced that they would reopen the murder investigation of his death.

Mossad co-ordinated the assassination of Israeli general Yekutiel Adam. General Adam was chosen as the head of Mossad but was hated by a right-wing clique of extremists within it, who co-ordinated his assassination when he went to Lebanon. The death of the general was reported to be a combat casualty, but Ostrovsky states that friends who were active in the Mossad told him that the clique in the Mossad had paid a Palestinian to assassinate Adam and that a picture of the General was found in the pocket of the Palestinian assassin working for Mossad. 

In mid-February 1986, the Mossad allegedly planted a radio relay device, the "Trojan", in a rented apartment in Tripoli, the capital of Libya. 

The book reports the Mossad's involvement in the Ustica Massacre (Itavia Flight 870) by a conversation taking place at the end of January 1990 in an hotel in Ottawa, Canada between the author and an English colleague:
"Do you believe or think or know if the Mossad may have had any involvement in what happened to Flight 103 over Lockerbie?". I was dumbfounded. It took me several seconds to realize what the man had asked me. I responded almost automatically. "No way." "Why?" "No reason. Just no way, that's all. Up to this point, every time Israel or the Mossad has been responsible for the downing of a plane, it's been an accident, and related directly to the so-called security of the state, like the shooting down of the Libyan plane over the Sinai and the Italian plane (thought to carry uranium) in 1980, killing eighty-one people. There is no way that they'd do this".

References 

Books about the Mossad
1994 non-fiction books
HarperCollins books